The 1978 Irish Masters was the fourth edition of the professional invitational snooker tournament (and the first under the Irish Masters name) which took place in March 1978. The tournament was played at Goffs in Kill, County Kildare, and featured five professional players.

John Spencer won the title for the third time, beating Doug Mountjoy 5–3 in the final.

Main draw

References

Irish Masters
Irish Masters
Irish Masters
Irish Masters